Down to the Sea in Ships may refer to:

Down to the Sea in Ships (1922 film), an American silent film
Down to the Sea in Ships (1949 film), Lionel Barrymore, Richard Widmark and Dean Stockwell
Down to the Sea in Ships (album) (1956), by Burl Ives